K. A. Subramaniam (5 March 1931  – 27 November 1989) was a Sri Lankan leftist political leader. He was one of the key member for the formation of the Ceylon Communist Party (Maoist). He was the founding General Secretary of the Communist Party of Sri Lanka (Left)

References

External links
 Comrade Maniam Commemoration Volume 1989   A collection of messages and Tributes
Comrade Maniam Memories 2014  Book by S. K. Senthivel
Thayagam from Sri Lanka dated 27 January 1990 The Editorial about K.A. Subramaniam involvement in Art and Literature.

1931 births
1989 deaths
Sri Lankan communists
Sri Lankan Tamil politicians
People from British Ceylon